The Edgewood Country Club Open also known as the Tivoli Open was a tennis tournament first established in 1885 at Tivoli, New York, United States and played at the Edgewood Country Club on clay courts. It was part of the U.S. lawn tennis tennis circuit until 1916.

History
The Edgewood Country Club Open was a tennis tournament first established in 1885 atTivoli, New York, United States and played on clay courts at the Edgewood Country Club Open, originally founded as the Tivoli Lawn Tennis Club of which one of the founding members was Valentine Gill Hall. It was part of the U.S. lawn tennis tennis circuit until 1916.

Finals

Men's Singles
 1885— Valentine Gill Hall def. ? 
 1886— Valentine Gill Hall def. ? 
 1887— Valentine Gill Hall def. ? 
 1916— Frank Brown Ransom def.   Michael Whitehead, 1–6, 6–3, 8–6, 4–6, 10–8

Venue
In 1883 the Tivoli Lawn Tennis Club was established the name was later changed to the Edgewood Country Club.

References

Clay court tennis tournaments
Defunct tennis tournaments in the United States